37 Librae is a single star in the southern zodiac constellation of Libra. It is visible to the naked eye as a faint, orange-hued star with an apparent visual magnitude of 4.61. The star is located 94 light years from the Sun based on parallax, and is drifting further away with a radial velocity of +49 km/s.

This is an evolving subgiant star with a stellar classification of K1 III–IV, where the luminosity class indicates the spectrum displays blended traits of a subgiant and a giant star. It is an estimated 3.4 billion years old with 1.4 times the mass of the Sun. Having the supply of hydrogen at its core all but exhausted, the star is starting to expand; currently it has five times the girth of the Sun. It is radiating 13.5 times the Sun's luminosity from its enlarged photosphere at an effective temperature of 4,836 K.

References

K-type subgiants
High-proper-motion stars
Libra (constellation)
Durchmusterung objects
Librae, 37
138716
076219
5777